Biltmore Village, formerly  Best, is a small village that is now entirely in the city limits of Asheville, North Carolina and near the town of Biltmore Forest. It is adjacent to the main entrance of the Biltmore Estate, built by George W. Vanderbilt, one of the heirs to the Vanderbilt family fortune. Once known as the town of Best, George Vanderbilt created this village as a "company town" for the estate workers. The community was planned and designed to reflect the qualities of an English country village. The village had its own church, which is still in operation today as the Cathedral of All Souls, an Episcopal cathedral. The village also had a hospital, shops, a school, a train station, and other services available. 

Biltmore Village was incorporated into the City of Asheville in the early 20th century. Biltmore Village is now a commercial district that has an eclectic collection of shops, restaurants, and other businesses.

External links
Biltmore Village Historic Museum
Historic Biltmore Village
All Souls Cathedral
Asheville, North Carolina, a National Park Service Discover Our Shared Heritage Travel Itinerary

Tourist attractions in Asheville, North Carolina
Villages in Buncombe County, North Carolina
Vanderbilt family